The name Macedonia is used in a number of competing or overlapping meanings to describe geographical, political and historical areas, languages and peoples in a part of south-eastern Europe. It has been a major source of political controversy since the early 20th century. The situation is complicated because different ethnic groups use different terminology for the same entity, or the same terminology for different entities, with different political connotations.

Historically, the region has presented markedly shifting borders across the Balkan peninsula. Geographically, no single definition of its borders or the names of its subdivisions is accepted by all scholars and ethnic groups. Demographically, it is mainly inhabited by four ethnic groups, three of which self-identify as Macedonians: two, a Bulgarian and a Greek one at a regional level, while a third ethnic Macedonian one at a national level. Linguistically, the names and affiliations of languages and dialects spoken in the region are a source of controversy. Politically, the rights to the extent of the use of the name Macedonia and its derivatives has led to a diplomatic dispute between Greece and North Macedonia. After using the provisional reference of the "former Yugoslav Republic of Macedonia" (FYROM), Greece and the then-Republic of Macedonia reached an agreement that the latter would change its name to North Macedonia. It came into effect on 12 February 2019.

Etymology 
The name Macedonia derives from the Greek  (Makedonía), a kingdom (later, region) named after the ancient Macedonians, from the Greek  (Makedones), "Macedonians", explained as having originally meant either "the tall ones" or "highlanders". The word  (Makednon) is first attested in Herodotus as the name which the Greek ethnos was called (which was later called Dorian) when it settled around Pindus mountain range. Makednon is related to the Ancient Greek adjective  (makednós), meaning "tall, slim", attested in Homer and Hesychius of Alexandria in its feminine form "μακεδνή" (makednē), meaning "long, tall". Linguist Robert S. P. Beekes claims that both terms are of Pre-Greek substrate origin and cannot be explained in terms of Indo-European morphology, however De Decker argues the arguments are insufficient.

History 

The region of Macedonia has been home to several historical political entities, which have used the name Macedonia; the main ones are given below. The borders of each of these entities were different.

Early history

Ancient Macedonia 

Macedonia or Macedon, the ancient kingdom, was located on the periphery of Archaic and Classical Greece, and later became the dominant state of Hellenistic Greece. It was centered on the fertile plains west of the Gulf of Salonica (today north-western Greece); the first Macedonian state emerged in the 8th or early 7th century BC. Its extent beyond the center varied; some Macedonian kings could not hold their capital; Philip II expanded his power until it reached from Epirus, across Thrace to Gallipoli, and from Thermopylae to the Danube. His son Alexander the Great conquered most of the land in southwestern Asia stretching from what is currently Turkey in the west to parts of India in the east. However, while Alexander's conquests are of major historical importance as having launched the Hellenistic Age, Macedon as a state had no significant territorial gains due to them. Alexander's kingdom fell apart after his death in 323 BC; several of his Successors attempted to form a kingdom for themselves in Macedonia; the kingdom formed by Antigonus Gonatas contained all the land Philip II had started with and controlled much of what is now modern Greece; it lasted until the Romans divided it into four republics in 168 BC.

Roman Macedonia 

The ancient Romans had two different entities called Macedonia, at different levels. Macedonia was established as a Roman province in 146 BC. Its boundaries were shifted from time to time for administrative convenience, but during the Roman Republic and the Principate it extended west to the Adriatic and south to Central Greece.

Under Diocletian, Thessaly, including parts of West Macedonia, was split off to form a new province, and the central and southern Balkan provinces were grouped into the Diocese of Moesia. At some point in the 4th century (first securely attested in 370) this was divided into two new dioceses, the mostly Latin-speaking Diocese of Dacia in the north and the mostly Greek-speaking Diocese of Macedonia in the south. Under Constantine the Great, the western part of the province of Macedonia was also split off to form the new province of Epirus nova. After Constantine's death, the western Balkans, Macedonia included, became part of the praetorian prefecture of Illyricum.

With the exception of a short-lived division between Macedonia Prima in the south and Macedonia Salutaris in the north towards the end of the 4th century (attested only in the Notitia Dignitatum), Macedonia formed a single province until re-divided into southern and northern parts sometime in the late 5th century (the division is first securely attested in 482), although the province seems to have been reunified by 535. According to the 6th-century Synecdemus, Macedonia Prima, with Thessalonica as its capital and governed by a consularis, counted 32 cities, and Macedonia Secunda in the north, with Stobi as its capital and governed by a praeses, only eight. The approximate boundary between the two ran on a rough line from north of Bitola (which belonged to Macedonia Prima) to the area of Demir Kapija.

Byzantine Macedonia 

During the 7th century, most of the Balkans were overrun by Slavic invasions, which left only the fortified towns and the coasts in the hands of the Greek-speaking Byzantine Empire. "Macedonia" was then used for a new theme in the late 8th century under Irene of Athens. Geographically however it was located in Thrace and not in Macedonia, which was under the themes of Thessalonica, Strymon and other smaller commands such as Boleron or Drougoubiteia. Themes were not named geographically and the original sense was "army". They became districts during the military and fiscal crisis of the seventh century, when the Byzantine armies were instructed to find their supplies from the locals, wherever they happened to be. Thus the Armeniac theme was considerably west of Armenia; the Thracesian Theme was in Asia Minor, not in Thrace. The Macedonian dynasty of the Byzantine Empire acquired its name from its founder, Basil I the Macedonian, an Armenian by descent, who was born in the theme of Macedonia.

The interior of Macedonia remained in Slavic and later Bulgarian hands until the campaigns of Basil II, which ended the existence of the Bulgarian state and extended Byzantine authority across the central and northern Balkans. Thereafter Macedonia remained under Byzantine control until the Fourth Crusade (1204). A short-lived Latin Kingdom of Thessalonica was established which survived until 1224, when it was captured by Epirus. Most of Macedonia then came under the control of the Empire of Nicaea in 1246, although its northern regions remained disputed with the Serbs and the Bulgarians. Most of the region was conquered by the Serbs under Stephen Dushan during the Byzantine civil war of 1341–1347. Only Thessalonica and its environs remained in Byzantine hands. By the late 14th century, the Ottoman Turks in turn had conquered the region, although Thessalonica held out under Byzantine and later Venetian control until 1430.

Ottomans and geographical Macedonia 

The Ottomans did not keep Macedonia as an administrative unit: since 1864 parts of geographical Macedonia lay in three vilayets, which also comprised some non-Macedonian areas. The northern part was the Kosovo vilayet and then of Skopje; the Thessaloniki (south), and the Monastir Vilayet (western) were also created. This administrative division lasted until 1912–13, when Macedonia was divided among the Balkan states.

Modern history 

Since the early stages of the Greek Revolution, the provisional government of Greece claimed Macedonia as part of Greek national territory, but the Treaty of Constantinople (1832), which established a Greek independent state, set its northern boundary between Arta and Volos. When the Ottoman Empire started breaking apart, Macedonia was claimed by all members of the Balkan League (Serbia, Montenegro, Greece and Bulgaria), and by Romania. Under the Treaty of San Stefano that ended the Russo-Turkish War, 1877–78 the entire region, except Thessaloniki, was included in the borders of Bulgaria, but after the Congress of Berlin in 1878 the region was returned to the Ottoman Empire. The armies of the Balkan League advanced and occupied Macedonia in the First Balkan War in 1912. Because of disagreements between the allies about the partition of the region, the Second Balkan War erupted, and in its aftermath the arbitrary region of Macedonia was split into the following entities, that existed or still exist in this region:
 Macedonia (as a region of Greece) refers to three regions in northern Greece, incorporated in 1913, as a result of the Balkan Wars between the Ottoman Empire and the Balkan League.
 Macedonia (as a People's Republic within Yugoslavia) used to refer to the People's Republic of Macedonia established in 1946, later known as the Socialist Republic of Macedonia, one of the constituent republics of the Socialist Federal Republic of Yugoslavia, renamed in 1963. Between 1929 and 1941 this region was part of Vardar Banovina province in the Kingdom of Yugoslavia.
 Macedonia (as a recent sovereign state) referred to the conventional short form name of the Republic of Macedonia, after the aforementioned Socialist Republic held a referendum and established its independence from Yugoslavia on 8 September 1991. On 12 February 2019 the name of the state was changed to Republic of North Macedonia following the ratification of the Prespa agreement negotiated with Greece, thus settling the Macedonia naming dispute.

Geography 
Macedonia (as a current geographical term) refers to a region of the Balkan peninsula in south-eastern Europe, covering some 60,000 or 70,000 square kilometers. Although the region's borders are not officially defined by any international organization or state, in some contexts, the territory appears to correspond to the basins of (from west to east) the Haliacmon (Aliákmonas), Vardar / Axios and Struma / Strymónas rivers, and the plains around Thessaloniki and Serres.

In a historic context, the term Macedonia was used in various ways. Macedonia was not an administrative division of the Ottoman Empire; its entire territory was part of the beylerbeylik of Rumelia. The geographer H. R. Wilkinson suggests that the region "defies definition" but that many mappers agree "on its general location". Macedonia was well enough defined in 1897 for Gladstone to propose "Macedonia for the Macedonians"; philhellenes argued that the phrase could not be used by a man of impartiallity, while Turcophiles asserted that there are six different kinds of Macedonians, and only Turkish rule could prevail total anarchy in the region. The Balkan nations began to proclaim their rights to it after the Treaty of San Stefano in 1878 and its revision at the Congress of Berlin.

Many ethnographic maps were produced in this period of controversy; these differ primarily in the areas given to each nationality within Macedonia. This was in part a result of the choice of definition: an inhabitant of Macedonia might well have different nationalities depending on whether the basis of classification was denomination, descent, language, self-identification or personal choice. In addition, the Ottoman census, taken on the basis of religion, was misquoted by all sides; descent, or "race", was largely conjectural; inhabitants of Macedonia might speak a different language at the market and at home, and the same Slavic dialect might be called Serbian "with Bulgarian influences", Macedonian, or West-Bulgarian.

These maps also differed somewhat in the boundaries given to Macedonia. Its only inarguable limits were the Aegean Sea and the Serbian and Bulgarian frontiers (as of 1885); where it bordered Old Serbia, Albania, and Thrace (all parts of Ottoman Rumelia) was debatable.

The Greek ethnographer Nicolaides, the Austrian Meinhard, and the Bulgarian Kǎnčev placed the northern boundary of Macedonia at the Šar Mountains and the Crna hills, as had scholars before 1878. The Serb Spiridon Gopčević preferred a line much further south, assigning the entire region from Skopje to Strumica to "Old Serbia"; and some later Greek geographers have defined a more restricted Macedonia. In addition, maps might vary in smaller details: as to whether this town or that was Macedonian. One Italian map included Prizren, where Nicolaides and Meinhard had drawn the boundary just south of it. On the south and west, Grevena, Korçë, and Konitsa varied from map to map; on the east, the usual line is the lower Mesta / Nestos river and then north or northwest, but one German geographer takes the line so far west as to exclude Bansko and Nevrokop / Gotse Delchev.

Subregions 

The region of Macedonia is commonly divided into three major and two minor sub-regions. The name Macedonia appears under certain contexts on the major regions, while the smaller ones are traditionally referred to by other local toponyms:

Major regions 
The region of Macedonia is commonly split geographically into three main sub-regions, especially when discussing the Macedonian Question. The terms are used in non-partisan scholarly works, although they are also used in ethnic Macedonian literature of an irredentist nature.

Aegean Macedonia (or Greek Macedonia) refers to an area in the south of the Macedonia region. The borders of the area are, overall, those of ancient Macedonia in Greece.

Pirin Macedonia (or Bulgarian Macedonia) is an area in the east of the Macedonia region. The borders of the area approximately coincide with those of Blagoevgrad Province in Bulgaria.

Vardar Macedonia (formerly Yugoslav Macedonia) is an area in the north of the Macedonia region. The borders of the area are those of North Macedonia.

Minor regions 
In addition to the above-named sub-regions, there are also three smaller regions, in Albania, Kosovo and Serbia respectively. These regions are also considered geographically part of Macedonia. They are referred to by ethnic Macedonians as follows, but typically are not so referred to by non-partisan scholars.

Mala Prespa and Golo Brdo is a small area in the west of the Macedonia region in Albania, mainly around Lake Ohrid. It includes parts of the Korçë, Pogradec and Devoll districts.

Gora (part of the municipality of Dragaš) and Prohor Pčinjski are minor parts in the north of the Macedonia region in Serbia.

Demographics 

The region, as defined above, has a total population of about 5 million. The main disambiguation issue in demographics is the self-identifying name of two contemporary groups. The ethnic Macedonian population of North Macedonia self-identify as Macedonian on a national level, while the Greek Macedonians self-identify as both Macedonian on a regional, and Greek on a national level. According to the Greek arguments, the ancient Macedonians' nationality was Greek and thus, the use of the term on a national level lays claims to their history. This disambiguation problem has led to a wide variety of terms used to refer to the separate groups, more information of which can be found in the terminology by group section.

The self-identifying Macedonians (collectively referring to the inhabitants of the region) that inhabit or inhabited the area are:

As an ethnic group, Macedonians refers to the majority (58.4%, 2021) of the population of North Macedonia. Statistics for 2021 indicate the population of ethnic Macedonians within the country as c. 1,100,000. On the other hand, as a legal term, it refers to all the citizens of the Republic of North Macedonia, irrespective of their ethnic or religious affiliation. However, the preamble of the constitution distinguishes between "the Macedonian people" and the "Albanians, Turks, Vlachs, Romanics and other nationalities living in the Republic of Macedonia", but for whom "full equality as citizens" is provided. As of 2021 the total population of the country is 1,836,713.

As a regional group in Greece, Macedonians refers to ethnic Greeks (98%, 2001) living in regions referred to as Macedonia, and particularly Greek Macedonia. This group composes the vast majority of the population of the Greek region of Macedonia. The 2001 census for the total population of the Macedonia region in Greece shows 2,625,681.

The same term in antiquity described the inhabitants of the kingdom of Macedon, including their notable rulers Philip II and Alexander the Great who self-identified as Greeks.

As a regional group in Bulgaria, Macedonians refers to the inhabitants of Bulgarian Macedonia, who in their vast majority self-identify as Bulgarians at a national level and as Macedonians at a regional, but not ethnic level. As of 2001, the total population of Bulgarian Macedonia is 341,245, while the ethnic Macedonians living in the same region are 3,117. The Bulgarian Macedonians also self-identify as Piriners (пиринци, pirintsi) to avoid confusion with the neighboring ethnic group.

Macedo-Romanians can be used as an alternative name for Aromanians, people living throughout the southern Balkans, especially in northern Greece, Albania, North Macedonia and Bulgaria, and as an emigrant community in Northern Dobruja, Romania. According to Ethnologue, their total population in all countries is 306,237. This not very frequent appellation is the only one with the disambiguating portmanteau, both within the members of the same ethnic group and the other ethnic groups in the area. To make matters more confusing, Aromanians are often called "Machedoni" by Romanians, as opposed to the citizens of North Macedonia, who are called "Macedoneni".

The ethnic Albanians living in the region of Macedonia, as defined above, are mainly concentrated in North Macedonia (especially in the northwestern part that borders Kosovo and Albania), and less in the Albanian minor sub-region of Macedonia around the Lake Ohrid. As of 2021, the total population of Albanians in North Macedonia is 446,245 or 24.3% of the country's total population.

Linguistics 

As language is one of the elements tied in with national identity, the same disputes that are voiced over demographics are also found in linguistics. There are two main disputes about the use of the word Macedonian to describe a linguistic phenomenon, be it a language or a dialect:

The origins of the Ancient Macedonian language are currently debated. At this time it is not conclusively determined whether the language/dialect was a Greek dialect related to Doric Greek or Aeolic Greek dialects among others, a sibling language of ancient Greek forming a Hellenic (i.e. Greco-Macedonian) supergroup, or viewed as an Indo-European language which is a close cousin to Greek (and perhaps somewhat related to Thracian or Phrygian languages). The scientific community generally agrees that, although sources are available (e.g. Hesychius' lexicon, Pella curse tablet) there is no decisive evidence to exclude any of the above hypotheses.

Modern Macedonian language, a South Slavic language, is not closely related to the Ancient Macedonian language. It is currently the subject of two major disputes. The first is over the name (alternative ways of referring to this language can be found in the terminology by group section and in the article Macedonian language naming dispute). The second dispute is over the existence of a Macedonian language distinct from Bulgarian, the denial of which is a position supported by nationalist groups, Bulgarian and other linguists and also by many ordinary Bulgarians.

Macedonian is also the name of a dialect of Modern Greek, a language of the Indo-European family. Additionally, Macedo-Romanian is an Eastern Romance language, spoken in Southeastern Europe by the Aromanians.

Politics 

The controversies in geographic, linguistic and demographic terms, are also manifested in international politics. Among the autonomous countries that were formed as a result of the breakup of Yugoslavia in the 1990s, was the (until then) subnational entity of the Socialist Federal Republic of Yugoslavia, by the official name of "Socialist Republic of Macedonia", the others being Serbia, Slovenia, Croatia, Bosnia and Herzegovina and Montenegro. The peaceful break-away of that nation resulted in the change of its name to "Republic of Macedonia".

For almost three decades, Republic of Macedonia was the constitutional name of North Macedonia, the sovereign state which occupies the northern part of the geographical region of Macedonia, which roughly coincides with the geographic subregion of Vardar Macedonia. The former Yugoslav Republic of Macedonia (FYROM) was a term used for this state by the main international organisations, including United Nations,
European Union,
NATO,
IMF,
WTO,
IOC,
World Bank,
EBRD,
OSCE,
FIFA,
and FIBA.
The term was introduced in 1993 by the United Nations, following a naming dispute with Greece. Some countries used this term as a stop-gap measure, pending resolution of the naming dispute.

Greece and North Macedonia each considered this name a compromise: it was opposed by some Greeks for containing the Greek self-identifying name Macedonia, and by many in North Macedonia for not being the short self-identifying name. For years Greece used it in both the abbreviated (FYROM or ΠΓΔΜ) and spellout form (Πρώην Γιουγκοσλαβική Δημοκρατία της Μακεδονίας).

The Macedonia naming dispute ended on 12 February 2019 when the two countries reached the Prespa agreement and the then-Republic of Macedonia changed its name to North Macedonia.

Macedonia refers also to a geographic region in Greece, which roughly coincides with the southernmost major geographic subregion of Macedonia. It is divided into the three administrative sub-regions (regions) of West, Central, and East Macedonia and Thrace. The region is overseen by the Ministry for Macedonia–Thrace. The capital of Greek Macedonia is Thessaloniki, which is the largest city in the region of Macedonia; Greeks often call it the "co-capital" of Greece.

Ethnic Macedonian nationalism 

Ethnic Macedonian irredentists following the idea of a "United Macedonia" have expressed claims to what they refer to as "Aegean Macedonia" (in Greece), "Pirin Macedonia" (in Bulgaria), "Mala Prespa and Golo Bardo" (in Albania), and "Gora and Prohor Pčinjski" (in Serbia).

Loring Danforth, a professor of anthropology at Bates College, asserts that ethnic Macedonian nationalists, who are concerned with demonstrating the continuity between ancient and modern Macedonians, deny they are Slavs and claim to be the direct descendants of Alexander the Great and the ancient Macedonians. Danforth stresses, however, that the more moderate Macedonian position, publicly endorsed by Kiro Gligorov, the first president of the Republic of Macedonia, is modern Macedonians have no relation to Alexander the Great, but are a Slavic people whose ancestors arrived in Macedonia in the sixth century AD. Proponents of both the extreme and the moderate Macedonian positions stress that the ancient Macedonians were a distinct non-Greek people. In addition to affirming the existence of the Macedonian nation, Macedonians are concerned with affirming the existence of a unique Macedonian language as well. They thus emphasize that the Macedonian language has a history dating to the Old Church Slavonic used by Saints Cyril and Methodius in the ninth century.

Although ethnic Macedonians agree Macedonian minorities exist in Bulgaria and Greece and these minorities have been subjected to harsh policies of forced assimilation, there are two different positions with regard to what their future should be. These were summarized by Danforth:

Schoolbooks and official government publications in the Republic have shown the country as part of an "unliberated" whole, although the constitution of the Republic, especially after its amendment in 1995, does not include any territorial claims.

Greek nationalism 

Danforth describes the Greek position on Macedonia as follows: because Alexander the Great and the ancient Macedonians were Greeks, and because ancient and modern Greece are bound in an unbroken line of racial and cultural continuity, it is only Greeks who have the right to identify themselves as Macedonians. According to Danforth, this is why Greeks generally refer to Ethnic Macedonians as "Skopians", a practice comparable to calling Greeks "Athenians". Danforth asserts that the negation of Macedonian identity in Greek nationalist ideology focuses on three main points: the existence of a Macedonian nation, a Macedonian language, and a Macedonian minority in Greece. More specifically, Danforth says:

Thus from the Greek nationalist perspective the use of the term "Macedonian" by the "Slavs of Skopje" constitutes a "felony", an "act of plagiarism" against the Greek people. Greek nationalists believe that, by calling themselves "Macedonians", the ethnic Macedonians are "stealing" a Greek name, "embezzling" Greek cultural heritage, and "falsifying" Greek history. Greek fears that the use of the name "Macedonia" by the ethnic Macedonians will inevitably lead to the assertion of irredentist claims to territory in Greek Macedonia are heightened by fairly recent historical events.

From a different point of view, Demetrius Andreas M.-A. Floudas, of Hughes Hall, Cambridge, a leading commentator on the naming dispute from the Greek side, sums up this nationalistic reaction as follows: the Republic of Macedonia was accused of usurping the historical and cultural patrimony of Greece "in order to furnish a nucleus of national self-esteem for the new state and provide its citizens with a new, distinct, non-Bulgarian, non-Serbian, non-Albanian identity". The Republic emerged thus to Greek eyes as a country with a personality crisis, "a nondescript parasitic state" that lived off the history of its neighbours, because it allegedly lacked an illustrious past of its own, for the sake of achieving cohesion for what Greeks regarded as an "unhomogeneous little new nation".

Although generally supportive of the Greek position, Floudas criticises some elements of the Greek stance as follows:

As of early 2008, the official position of Greece, adopted unanimously by the four largest political parties, has made a more moderate shift towards accepting a "composite name solution" (i.e. the use of the name "Macedonia" plus some qualifier), so as to disambiguate the former Yugoslav Republic from the Greek region of Macedonia and the wider geographic region of the same name.

Names in the languages of the region 
 Albanian: 
 Aromanian: /
 Bulgarian: 
 Greek: 
 Ladino: , 
 Macedonian: 
 Megleno-Romanian: 
 Romany: 
 Serbian: , 
 Serbian (archaic): , 
 Turkish:

Terminology by group 

Bulgarians and ethnic Macedonians seek to deny the self-identification of the Slavic speaking minority in northern Greece, which mostly self-identifies as Greek.

Bulgarian 
 Gărkomani (Гъркомани) is a derogatory term used to refer to the largest portion of the Slavic-speaking minority of Macedonia in Greece who self-identify as Greeks.
 Macedonian (Македонец) is a person originating from the region of Macedonia – the term has only regional, not ethnic meaning, and it usually means a Bulgarian, or a clarification is made (Greek, Albanian...).
 Macedonian (Македонски) and the Slavic dialects of Greece are considered dialects of Bulgarian by Bulgarian linguists; not independent languages or dialects of other languages (e.g. Serbian). This is also the popular view in Bulgaria. The Bulgarian government, therefore, has officially recognized the language merely as "the constitutional language of the Republic of North Macedonia". Translations are officially called "adaptations".
 Macedonism (Македонизъм) is the political ideology or simply views that the Slavs of Macedonia are an ethnic group separate from Bulgarians, with their own separate language, history and culture. It is also used to describe what Bulgarians view as the falsification of their history whether by Macedonian or foreign scholars who subscribe to the Macedonist point of view. It carries strong negative connotations.
 Macedonian studies (Македонистика) is a term generally synonymous with disciplines such as the study of the origins of the Macedonian language and history of the Macedonian people conducted in North Macedonia and in the former Yugoslavia. It is generally considered in Bulgaria to be a kind of pseudoscience.
 Macedonist (Македонист) is a person (typically Macedonian Slav) who believes that Macedonian Slavs are not ethnic Bulgarians but a separate ethnic group, directly descended from the ancient Macedonians. It is a more negatively charged synonym of "Macedonian nationalist". More rarely it is used for someone associated with the study of the origins of the Macedonian language and history of the Macedonian people (not necessarily from North Macedonia or Yugoslavia), whose studies support the official historical doctrine of North Macedonia or former Yugoslavia.
 Sărbomani (Сърбомани) is a derogatory term used to refer to people in North Macedonia self-identifying as Serbian, or having a pro-Serb orientation. It is also used pejoratively by Bulgarians to refer to Macedonians who refuse the Bulgarian national idea.
 Old Bulgarian (Старобългарски) is the name Bulgarians give to the Old Church Slavonic language used in the Ohrid Literary School among others. In contrast, Old Church Slavonic is rarely referred to by ethnic Macedonians as "Old Macedonian" or "Old Slavic".

Greek 
 Macedonia (Μακεδονία) usually refers to the region of Greek Macedonia. It can also refer to the modern general definition of Macedonia, but rarely so.
 Macedonian (Μακεδόνας) refers to an ethnically Greek Macedonian.
 Ancient Macedonian (Αρχαίος Μακεδόνας) refers to an Ancient Macedonian.
 Macedonian Slav, Slavic Macedonian or Slavomacedonian (Σλαβομακεδόνας) refers to a member of the Macedonian ethnic group.
 Macedonian Slavic, Slavic Macedonian or Slavomacedonian (Σλαβομακεδονικά) refers to the Macedonian language.
 Republic of Skopje (Δημοκρατία των Σκοπίων) refers to North Macedonia.
 State of Skopje (Κράτος των Σκοπίων) refers to North Macedonia.
 Skopje, or Skopia (Σκόπια) refers to either North Macedonia or its capital city of Skopje.
 Skopjan, or Skopian (Σκοπιανός) refers to a member of the ethnic Macedonian ethnic group living in the Republic or outside it, but not to any group native to Greece.
 Skopiana or Skopianika (Σκοπιανά or Σκοπιανικά) refers to the Macedonian language.
 Slavophone (Σλαβόφωνος) refers to a member of the Slavic speaking minority in Greece.
 Bulgaroskopian (Βουλγαροσκοπιανός) refers to ethnic Macedonians, implying Bulgarian ethnic affiliation.
 Pseudomacedonian (Ψευτομακεδόνας) refers to ethnic Macedonians, and asserts their nationhood is contrived.

The last eight terms are often considered offensive in North Macedonia.

Ethnic Macedonian 
 Macedonia (Македонија) can refer to either the region of Macedonia or the Republic of North Macedonia.
 Macedonians (Македонци) generally refers to the Macedonian ethnic group associated with North Macedonia, neighbouring countries and abroad.
 Aegean Macedonia (Егејска Македонија – Egejska Makedonija) refers to Macedonia in Greece (as defined by the administrative division of Greece).
 Pirin Macedonia (Пиринска Македонија – Pirinska Makedonija) refers to the Blagoevgrad Province of Bulgaria (as defined by the administrative division of Bulgaria).
 Bugaraši (бугараши) or bugarofili (бугарофили) are derogatory terms used to refer to people in North Macedonia self-identifying as Bulgarian, or having a pro-Bulgarian orientation.
 Egejci (Егејци) refers to people living in North Macedonia and abroad that are originating from Aegean Macedonia (Greek Macedonia), mainly refugees from the Greek Civil War, also known as Aegean Macedonians.
 Grkomani (гркомани) is a derogatory term used to refer to the largest portion of the Slavic-speaking minority of Macedonia in Greece who self-identify as Greeks.
 Srbomani (србомани) or srbofili (србофили) are derogatory terms used to refer to people in North Macedonia self-identifying as Serbian, or having a pro-Serb orientation.

The first three terms are often considered offensive in Greece.

See also

 List of homonymous states and regions
 Macedonians (obsolete terminology)

Notes

References

Sources

External links 
 

Controversies in Europe
Culture-related controversies
Geography terminology
Greece–North Macedonia relations